Symphyotrichum regnellii (formerly Aster regnellii) is a species of herbaceous flowering plants in the family Asteraceae native to Argentina and Brazil. It grows  in height. It grows in swamps and wet savannas.

Distribution
Symphyotrichum regnellii is native to Argentina and Brazil, specifically in the following jurisdictions. In Argentina, it is native to the provinces of Corrientes and Misiones. In Brazil, it is native to the states of Goiás, Minas Gerais, Paraná, Rio Grande do Sul, Santa Catarina, and São Paulo, as well as the Federal District.

Citations

References

regnellii
Flora of Argentina
Flora of Brazil
Plants described in 1882
Taxa named by John Gilbert Baker